Milon-la-Chapelle is a commune in the Yvelines department in the Île-de-France region in north-central France.

Arts and culture
A chapel in the village, the Église de l'Assomption de la très Sainte Vierge, has a bas-relief sculpture by Georges Saupique.

See also
Communes of Yvelines

References

Communes of Yvelines